Edmond Baudoin (born 23 April 1942 in Nice) is a French artist, illustrator, and writer of sequential art and graphic novels.

Biography 
Baudoin left school at the age of 16 and went into military service.

He later worked as an accountant at the Palace de Nice (L’Hôtel Plaza). At 33, he left the accountant trade to pursue drawing.

Baudoin was an art professor from 1999 to 2003 at the University of Quebec.

Publications 
 Travesti, L'Association, 2007
 Le petit train de la côte bleue, 6 pieds sous terre, 2007
 "Les essuie-glaces, collection Aire Libre, Dupuis, 2006
 La patience du grand singe, en collaboration avec Céline Wagner, Tartamudo Editions, 2006
 Patchwork, Éditions Le 9e Monde, 2006
 L'Espignole, L'Association, 2006
 La musique du dessin, Éditions de l'An 2, 2005
 Crazyman, L'Association, 2005
 Le chant des baleines, collection Aire Libre, Dupuis, 2005
 Araucaria, carnets du Chili, collection Mimolette, L'Association, 2004
 Les yeux dans le mur, en collaboration avec Céline Wagner, collection Aire Libre, Dupuis, 2003
 Chagrin d'Encre 2, Portfolio en serigraphie, Éditions Le 9e Monde, 1998
 Questions de dessin, Éditions de l'An 2, 2002
 Le chemin de Saint-Jean, L'Association, 2002
 Taches de Jazz, Éditions Le 9e Monde, 2002
 Les quatre fleuves, scénario de Fred Vargas, Éditions Viviane Hamy, 2000
 Chroniques de l'éphémère, 6 pieds sous terre, 1999
 Salade niçoise, collection Ciboulette, L'Association, 1999
 Le chemin aux oiseaux, scénario de Nadine Brun-Cosme, Seuil, 1999
 Chagrin d'Encre, Portfolio en serigraphie, Éditions Le 9e Monde, 1998
 Piero, Seuil, 1998
 Véro, collection Histoires Graphiques, Éditions Autrement, 1998
 Nam, collection Patte de Mouche, L'Association, 1998
 Lalin, scénario de Joan Luc Sauvaigo, Z'éditions, 1997
 Derrière les fagots, Z'éditions, 1996
 Le voyage, collection Ciboulette, L'Association, 1996
 Mat, Seuil, 1996
 Terrains vagues, collection Eperluette, L'Association, 1996
 Rachid, Seuil, 1995
 Made in U.S., collection Patte de Mouche, L'Association, 1995
 Éloge de la poussière, collection Eperluette, L'Association, 1995
 La mort du peintre, Z'éditions, 1995 (réédité par 6 pieds sous terre en 2005)
 Abbé Pierre, le défi, Tom Pousse, 1994
 Carla, scénario de Jacques Lob, Futuropolis, 1993
 Le Journal du voleur, de Jean Genet, Futuropolis, 1993
 Théorème, de Pier Paolo Pasolini, Futuropolis, 1992
 Couma acò, Futuropolis, 1991 (réédité par L'Association en 2005)
 Harrouda, de Tahar Ben Jelloun, Futuropolis, 1991
 Baudoin, collection 30x40, Futuropolis, 1990 (réédité par L'Association sous le titre Le portrait)
 Le Procès-verbal, illustrations du roman de J-M.G. Le Clézio, Futuropolis Gallimard, 1989
 La Croisée, scénario de Frank, Les Humanoïdes Associés, 1988
 Théâtre d'Ombres, scénario de Frank, Les Humanoïdes Associés, 1987
 Le premier voyage, Futuropolis, 1987
 Un Rubis sur les Lèvres, collection Hic et Nunc, Futuropolis, 1986
 Avis de Recherché, scénario de Frank, Futuropolis, 1985
 La Danse devant le Buffet, scénario de Frank, Futuropolis, 1985
 Un Flip Coca, Futuropolis, 1984
 La peau du lézard, collection Hic et Nunc, Futuropolis, 1983
 Passe le temps, Futuropolis, 1982
 Les sentiers cimentés, Futuropolis, 1981
 Civilisation, collection Science-Fiction, Glénat, 1981

Awards
1992: Angoulême International Comics Festival Award for Best French Comic Book for Couma acò
1997: Angoulême International Comics Festival Award for Best Scenario for Le voyage
2001: Angoulême International Comics Festival Award for Best Scenario for Les quatre fleuves

References

External links 

1942 births
Living people
French comics artists